St Peters College is an integrated state secondary school in Gore, Southland, New Zealand. It was founded in 1969 as a private co-ed school and was the first Catholic co-educational boarding school established in New Zealand.

History
The idea of a Catholic secondary school in Gore was that of long-serving parish priest (1947–1972), Father (later Monsignor) Finlay. The 30-acre (12 hectare) site of the college was gradually purchased during the 1950s and 1960s and appeals were launched for funds in those decades for the construction of the school. In 1961, the Capuchin Fathers undertook to provide the staff and they became involved in the fund-raising activities in Gore. The first building work commenced with the object of opening the school in 1964. However, after the completion of the staff house and one dormitory, the Capuchins withdrew from the project. Fund-raising continued and in 1965 the Rosminian Order (the Institute of Charity) committed themselves to staff the school. The "advance guard" of Rosminians, Father S Marriott and Brother J Tadesco arrived and they worked with the "central committee" on the fund-raising project. A classroom block was built.

In 1968 Father L Hurdidge was appointed Headmaster. At the time of his appointment he was Deputy Head at St Gregory's College, Huddersfield which was a co-educational school. From the beginning of the project it was assumed that the Gore school would be boys-only but at the time of Father Hurdidge's appointment it was evident that it should be co-educational. His experience in Huddersfield was relevant to the decision to do this. The name of the School, St Peter's, was adopted and it was agreed that it would be staffed by the Sisters of Mercy and the Rosminians. The college was opened by Bishop Kavanagh of Dunedin on 26 January 1969, commencing with classes Form 1–3 (Years 7–9). The first staff consisted of: Fathers L Herdidge (Headmaster), J Buckner, B Hogan, Brothers J Tadesco, E Willett, J Wallace, Sisters Mary David (Senior Mistress), Mary Fidelus and Mary Stephena. Some of the Rosminians came from Rosmini College, Takapuna. The science block was completed soon after the school opened and later a gymnasium and two technical blocks were added. It was decided to build only one of the three proposed dormitory blocks, "Rosmini House", but a house bought on land in Kakapo Street opposite the school was renovated as a hostel for senior boys. It was named St Paul's Without the Walls and known as St Paul's.

The school chapel, built to an interesting and unusual design conducive to a prayerful atmosphere of peace and serenity, was opened in 1978. One important personality in the early years of the school was Brother Tedesco ("Brother Ted"). He was in charge of St Paul's and his service to the wider community included being elected to the Gore Borough Council. The Rosminians also took up some parish duties in the wider area. Fathers Kearns and Moynihan were successively parish priests of Mataura. The school became a State-integrated school on 1 February 1982. The school is now completely lay-staffed.

College Houses
The school has four houses which divide the students into groups for events such as athletics, swimming, cultural and community events. They are: McAuley (blue), Rosmini (yellow), Finlay (green) and Pompallier (red). Mother Catherine McAuley was the founder of the Sisters of Mercy. Antonio Rosmini was the founder of the Rosminians. Monsignor Finlay was the parish priest of Gore who inspired, and laboured unceasingly towards, the building of the college and Bishop Pompallier was the founder of the Catholic Church in New Zealand.  The college has a tradition of keeping the same house in family groups. "Rosmini House," the boarding hostel, also has its own set of two houses which the boarding students belong to. They are: Tedesco (orange) and Buckner (purple). Brother Tedesco (Brother Ted) was an important member of the original staff of the college (see above). Father Buckner was a staff member of St Peter's College.

Academic
The college is one of the highest ranking in the southern region. In 2004 and 2006 the school was the highest achieving in Southland, according to NCEA results.

Headmasters
 Father L Hurdidge IC (1969–1973)
 Father J Michael Hill IC (1974–1979)
 Father E J Willett IC (1980-1983)
 Mr Kerry Henderson (1984–1990)
 Mr John Boyce
 Mr Martin Chamberlain 
 Mr Jon Hogue
 Mrs Kate Nicholson (-2019)
 Mrs Tara Quinney (2020–present)

Notable alumni

 Mike Puru – TV and radio personality at The Edge
 Hayley Saunders – Southern Steel netball player
 Matt Saunders – North Otago, Otago, Southland Stags and Highlanders rugby union player

See also
 Gore High School

References

Boarding schools in New Zealand
Educational institutions established in 1969
Secondary schools in Southland, New Zealand
Catholic secondary schools in New Zealand
1969 establishments in New Zealand
Gore, New Zealand